Max Laurel (May 4, 1944 – June 11, 2016), was a Filipino actor and bodybuilder who played as Zuma in the 1985 film Zuma and 1987 film Anak ni Zuma.

Personal life
Max Laurel was born in Zamboanga City, Philippines on May 4, 1944. He married a woman named Alice Laurel.

Death
On June 11, 2016, Laurel had a cardiac arrest leading to his death. He was 71 years old. His wake took place on June 15, 2016 at La Funeraria Paz in Quezon City. He was buried on June 16, 2016 at La Loma Cemetery in Caloocan. He had three children and two grandchildren.

Filmography

Film

References

1945 births
2016 deaths
Burials at La Loma Cemetery
Filipino male film actors